Alan Norris Nelson (born 22 November 1965) is a former Irish cricketer.  Nelson was a right-handed batsman who bowled right-arm fast-medium.  He was born at Banbridge, County Down, Northern Ireland.  He was educated at Banbridge Academy.

Nelson made his first-class debut for Ireland against Scotland in 1988.  He made three further first-class appearances for Ireland between then and 1991, all of which came against Scotland.  In his four first-class appearances, he took 14 wickets at an average of 22.57, with best figures of 5/27.  With the bat, he scored 56 runs at an average of 18.66, with a high score of 23 not out.  He made his List A debut for Ireland against Gloucestershire in the 1988 NatWest Trophy.  He made five further List A appearances, the last of which came against Yorkshire in the 1993 NatWest Trophy.  In his six List A matches, he took just 4 wickets at an average of 48.50, with best figures of 2/19.  While with the bat, he scored 20 runs at an average of 10.00, with a high score of 9 not out.  He also made six appearances for Ireland in the 1994 ICC Trophy in Kenya.

His brother, Noel, played a single first-class match for Ireland, while his son, Liam, has played Youth One Day Internationals for Ireland Under-19s.  Outside of cricket, Nelson works as a despatch clerk.

References

External links

1965 births
Living people
People from Banbridge
People educated at Banbridge Academy
Irish cricketers
Cricketers from Northern Ireland